David Adamovich Rigert (born 12 March 1947) is a retired Soviet weightlifter and weightlifting coach of Austrian ancestry. During his career he set 65 ratified world records and won an Olympic gold medal in 1976 and six world titles. In 1999 he was inducted to the International Weightlifting Federation Hall of Fame.

Family and early years
Rigert was the son of the Russian-German Adam Adamowitsch Rigert and Jelisaweta Rudolfowna Horn. His grandfather Adam Rigert worked at the estate of Baron Rudolf Horn, an officer of the czar. Baron Horn's daughter Lisbeth married Adam Rigert's son Adam. During World War II his father was brought to the Ural Mountains as forced laborer, together with other Russians of German ancestry, and his mother and children were brought to North Kazakhstan. David and his eight siblings grew up in Kuban territory near the Caucasus.

Rigert initially trained as a boxer, but then, motivated by the Yury Vlasov's victory at the 1960 Olympics, changed to weightlifting. After serving in the Soviet Army, he moved to Shakhty, to train with Rudolf Plyukfelder. In Shakhty Rigert worked as a coal miner.

Rigert is married to Nadezhda, a former competitive javelin thrower. They have three sons, Viktor, Vladislav and Denis, they all became competitive weightlifters. Rigert is an avid smoker, since the age of 11.

Career
Rigert began practicing weightlifting on his own in 1966, using the training methods of former Soviet weightlifting champion Arkady Vorobyov. Two years later, while serving in the Soviet army, Rigert earned the title Master of Sports of the USSR. After demobilization he lived and trained in Armavir. In 1969 he met the famous Soviet coach Rudolf Plyukfelder, who invited him to Shakhty, where Rigert began training at Trud Voluntary Sports Society under Plyukfelder. Just 11 months later, in 1970, Rigert was included into the Soviet national team and debuted internationally, earning a bronze medal at the world championships. In 1971 at the RSFSR Championships, Rigert set his first world record. Thus began an extraordinary series of 65 world records, which was exceeded only by the fellow weightlifter Vasiliy Alekseyev.

After a disappointing performance at the 1972 Summer Olympics, in 1973 Rigert won in all competitions he participated, setting eight world records. He won all world and European championships between 1973 and 1976, and earned a gold medal at the 1976 Summer Olympics. Despite these achievements during his career, his final performance was disappointing: scoring zero at the 1980 Summer Olympics. For those Games Rigert moved to a lighter bodyweight class, from under 100 kg to under 90 kg. As a result of the rapid weight loss, he tore his leg muscle.

After retiring from competitions Rigert moved to Rostov and later to Taganrog. He coached, studied at The Moscow Institute of Physical Culture, manufactured weights for weightlifting competitions and built some 100 sport facilities in Taganrog. He also created a weightlifting center in Taganrog and prepared the Russian National Team for the 2004 Olympics. In 2004 Rigert was elected deputy of the Taganrog City Council (Duma), and in March 2009 he was reelected as deputy of the Taganrog Duma, representing the United Russia political party. Rigert is a honorary citizen of Taganrog, Grozny and Chornomorsk.
 
Rigert was awarded Order of the Red Banner of Labour in 1976. In 1999 he was inducted into the International Weightlifting Federation hall of fame.

References

External links

 World records and biography of David Rigert
  Biography and photo 
 David Rigert Hall of Fame – Weightlifting Exchange

1947 births
Living people
Communist Party of the Soviet Union members
Honoured Coaches of Russia
Honoured Masters of Sport of the USSR
Medalists at the 1976 Summer Olympics
Merited Coaches of the Soviet Union
Olympic gold medalists for the Soviet Union
Olympic medalists in weightlifting
Olympic weightlifters of the Soviet Union
People from North Kazakhstan Region
Sportspeople from Taganrog
Recipients of the Medal of the Order "For Merit to the Fatherland" II class
Russian and Soviet-German people
Russian male weightlifters
Soviet male weightlifters
Weightlifters at the 1972 Summer Olympics
Weightlifters at the 1976 Summer Olympics
Weightlifters at the 1980 Summer Olympics
World Weightlifting Championships medalists
Russian State University of Physical Education, Sport, Youth and Tourism alumni